NewKidCo International Inc. (TSE:NKC; OTC BB: NKCIF) was an American video game publisher of children's titles based on popular licensed characters, for Sony, Nintendo and Microsoft consoles. It went out of business in 2005.

The publisher was acquired by Alpha Software which then was acquired by SoftQuad Software and subsequently, SoftQuad was renamed to NewKidCo.

Initially NewKidCo had subsidiary offices in Burlington, Massachusetts and Midtown Manhattan, New York City. At a later point, it was headquartered in Midtown Manhattan, with its only office being there.

NewKidCo had a partnership with Canadian animation studio CinéGroupe to make video games based on Tom and Jerry and Dora the Explorer. Circa 2003, two of NewKidCo's properties, Winnie the Pooh and Dora the Explorer, were sold to Gotham Games.

Most of their games were rated E for everyone, with the exception of Tom and Jerry in War of the Whiskers, which is rated T for teen due to its excessive yet cartoony violence.

In July 2000, Ubi Soft signed a publishing deal with the company to allow them to release the company's titles in PAL region territories.

Games

Canceled

 Droopy's Miniature Golf (Game Boy Advance)
 E.T.: Return to the Green Planet (PlayStation 2)
 E.T.: Salerian Project (Game Boy Advance)
 E.T.: Search for Dragora (GameCube, Xbox)
 Doug: Adventures in Bluffington (PlayStation)
 PB&J Otter: Noodle Dance Mania! (PlayStation)
 PB&J Otter: Pinch Saves the Day! (Game Boy Color)
 Little League Baseball 2002 (GameCube)
 The Super-Stoo-Pendus World of Dr. Seuss (Game Boy Advance)
 U.S. Youth Soccer: Power-Up Soccer (Game Boy Advance)

References

External links

 (archived)

Defunct video game companies of the United States
Video game companies disestablished in 2005
Defunct companies based in New York City